Bomba Saha Rosa (Bombs and Roses) is a 2013 Sri Lankan Sinhala romantic thriller film directed by Anuruddha Jayasinghe and produced by Eric Kusum Markavitage for Swiss Lanka & Lycky Asia Films. It stars Upeksha Swarnamali and Vishwanath Kodikara in lead roles along with Mahendra Perera and Bimal Jayakody. Music composed by Ranga Dasanayaka. It is the 1244th Sri Lankan film in the Sinhala cinema. Supporting actor Tharindu Wijesinghe died before the screening of the film.

Plot

Cast
 Upeksha Swarnamali as Shani
 Mahendra Perera as Gotta
 Bimal Jayakody as Mahil
 Darshan Dharmaraj as Nadan
 Vishwanath Kodikara as Nirmal
 Sriyani Amarasena
 Suminda Sirisena as Minister Daya
 Jayani Senanayake as Nandani
 Sampath Tennakoon as OIC
 Kumara Thirimadura as Freddy
 Pramudi Karunarathne as School girl
 Udayanthi Kulathunga as Subha
 Tharindu Wijesinghe as Damith
 Hisham Samsudeen as School boy
 Sampath Jayaweera as Tharaka
 Sarath Kothalawala as Silva
 Giriraj Kaushalya as Police seargent 
 Dharmapriya Dias
 Kalana Gunasekara as Bura

Soundtrack

References

2013 films
2010s Sinhala-language films